Van Buren Township is one of thirteen townships in Grant County, Indiana, United States. As of the 2010 census, its population was 1,934 and it contained 838 housing units.

Geography
The streams of Brushy Run, Little Black Creek and Roods Run run through this township.

Cities and towns
 Van Buren

Unincorporated towns
 Doyle Ferguson
 Farrville
(This list is based on USGS data and may include former settlements.)

Adjacent townships
 Jefferson Township, Huntington County (north)
 Salamonie Township, Huntington County (northeast)
 Jackson Township, Wells County (east)
 Washington Township, Blackford County (southeast)
 Monroe Township (south)
 Center Township (southwest)
 Washington Township (west)
 Wayne Township, Huntington County (northwest)

Cemeteries
The township contains six cemeteries: Cory, Doyle, Farrville, Landess, Lee and Masonic.

Major highways

Education
Van Buren Township residents may obtain a free library card from the Van Buren Public Library in Van Buren.

References
 U.S. Board on Geographic Names (GNIS)
 United States Census Bureau cartographic boundary files

External links
 Indiana Township Association
 United Township Association of Indiana

Townships in Grant County, Indiana
Townships in Indiana